The Tatra Beta was an electric car with about 100 cars produced, using nickel-cadmium batteries This electric car was originally created by Škoda ELCAR Ejpovice, and they were also initially manufactured under the ŠKODA brand. At that time, the production was directly connected to the production of the Škoda electric car ELTRA, derived from the Škoda Favorit. The car was produced from 1994 to 1999, and had parts taken from the 120L (front turn signals and headlights) and Favorit (chassis, glass, mirrors, handles, locks and interior) and from the Škoda Pick-UP (rear combination lamps). In 1996 the petrol version with Škoda's 1.3 engines also started to be produced. The original electric drive provided an asynchronous electric motor with maximum power of 40 kW, was powered via a frequency converter from a set of 30 pieces of Ni-Cd batteries. SAFT batteries type STM after 6V had a capacity of 100 Ah. Vehicle with they reached a speed of 110 km / h and covered 120 km per charge.

In 1997, the production of the electric version was completely discontinued and cooperation with the Korean carmaker Hyundai Motors has begun. The car got a Hyundai engine, dashboard with instruments and later also the entire interior, including the brakes from the Hyundai Accent. In total, only about 100 BETA electric cars were produced. Most of them traveled abroad, thanks to a very modern design AC electric drive and affordable price, many of them also ended as a visual teaching aid at various faculties of electrical engineering.

Felicia Pick-Up
Based on the study of the BETA Electric traction drive, it was successful to the students from the Faculty of Electrical Engineering SLOVENIA in Maribor to create their own university conversion into an electric car using a Škoda Felicia Pick-Up as a base. Today, only a few of these commercial electric cars are in operation in the Czech Republic.

References

Škoda automobiles
Production electric cars
1990s cars